Opočno is a municipality and village in Louny District in the Ústí nad Labem Region of the Czech Republic. It has about 100 inhabitants.

History
The first written mention of Opočno is from 1358.

References

Villages in Louny District